Carlia tetradactyla, the southern rainbow-skink, is a small species of colourful lizard found in Australia.

A synonym for the species is Mocoa tetradactyla, published with a description by A. W. E. O'Shaughnessy in 1879.
 
Distribution range includes the states of Victoria, New South Wales, and Queensland. The type locality is labelled as Queensland, but this is uncertain.

References 

Reptiles described in 1879
Carlia
Endemic fauna of Australia
Skinks of Australia
Taxa named by Arthur William Edgar O'Shaughnessy